This is a list of the extreme points of Pakistan.

Extreme points

Extreme altitude

Internal points

See also 

Geography of Pakistan
Extreme points of Asia
List of Pakistani provinces by highest elevation

Notes

References 

Geography of Pakistan
Pakistan